You is the fifth studio album by the progressive rock band Gong, released by Virgin Records in October 1974. It is the last album by Daevid Allen's iteration of the group until 1992's Shapeshifter. Recorded at Virgin's Manor Studios in Oxfordshire, England, side 1 was mixed at Pye Studios, Marble Arch, London, while side 2 was mixed at The Manor. It was produced by Simon Heyworth and Gong "under the universal influence of C.O.I.T., the Compagnie d'Opera Invisible de Thibet", and also engineered by Heyworth.

You is the third of the "Radio Gnome Invisible" trilogy of albums, following Flying Teapot and Angel's Egg. The trilogy forms a central part of the Gong mythology.
The structure of the album mixes short narrative pieces with long, jazzy instrumentals (such as "Master Builder", "A Sprinkling of Clouds" and "Isle of Everywhere"), building to a climax/conclusion with "You Never Blow Yr Trip Forever".

Legacy
Rolling Stone named You one of its "50 Greatest Prog Rock Albums Of All Time".

Lead guitarist Steve Hillage remade "Master Builder" as "The Glorious Om Riff" on his 1978 album "Green".

Japanese psych-rock band Acid Mothers Temple also frequently cover "Master Builder", entitled "Om Riff", and have released 2 full albums dedicated to album-length renditions of the song: 2005's "IAO Chant From The Cosmic Inferno" and 2012's "IAO Chant From The Melting Paraiso Underground Freak Out".

Track listing

Personnel 
Gong
Daevid Allen ("Dingo Virgin") – gliss guitar, vocals ("vocal locust and glissandoz guitar")
Gilli Smyth ("Shakti Yoni") – vocals ("poems and space whisper")
Didier Malherbe ("Bloomdido Bad de Grasse") – wind instruments and vocals
Tim Blake ("Hi T Moonweed") – Moog, EMS synthesizer, Mellotron
Miquette Giraudy ("Bambaloni Yoni") – vocals ("wee voices and chourousings")
Steve Hillage – lead guitar
Mike Howlett – bass guitar
Pierre Moerlen – drums, percussion
Mireille Bauer – pitched percussion
Benoit Moerlen – pitched percussion

Also credited
"Venux De Luxe" (Francis Linon) – Switch Doctor and stage sound
Wizz De Kidd – lighting
David ID – road management

References

1974 albums
Concept albums
Gong (band) albums
Jazz albums by British artists
Progressive rock albums by British artists
Space rock albums
Virgin Records albums